Silluvia is a genus of beetle in family Scarabaeidae. It belongs to subfamily Aegialiinae. Silluvia typically occur at high altitudes in the Himalaya and Sino-Tibetan mountains.

Species
Species belonging to this genus are as follows:
 Silluvia elongata
 Silluvia gansuensis
 Silluvia gogona
 Silluvia gosainkundae
 Silluvia himalayanus
 Silluvia igori
 Silluvia kabaki
 Silluvia petrovitzi
 Silluvia shashi
 Silluvia simbuae
 Silluvia sinica
 Silluvia wassuensis
 Silluvia wittmeri
 Silluvia yunnanica

References 

Scarabaeidae genera
Scarabaeidae